Fatwah may mean:
 Fatwa, a legal pronouncement in Islam
 Fatuha, a block in Patna, Bihar state, India
 Fatwa (film), a 2006 American drama/thriller film starring Lauren Holly